Simon Leslie Chadwick (born 15 March 1968) is an English former professional footballer who played as a striker. He made two appearances in the English Football League as a teenager in the 1980s with Wrexham.

References

1968 births
Living people
English footballers
Association football forwards
Wrexham A.F.C. players
English Football League players